Eremaeidae is a family of mites belonging to the order Sarcoptiformes.

Genera:
 Asperemaeus Behan-Pelletier, 1982
 Carinabella Hammer, 1977
 Eremaeus Koch, 1835
 Eueremaeus Mihelcic, 1963
 Rhynchobella Hammer, 1961
 Tricheremaeus Berlese, 1908
 Tuvermaeus Sellnick, 1930

References

Sarcoptiformes